Zuk, Żuk, or Žuk is a surname. Notable people with the surname include:

 Eva Maria Zuk (1945–2017), Polish-Mexican classical pianist
 Judith D. Zuk (1951–2007), American horticulturist and conservationist
 Kacper Żuk (born 1999), Polish tennis player
 Kamila Żuk (born 1997), Polish biathlete
 Krzysztof Żuk (born 1957), Polish economist and politician
 Paweł Żuk (disambiguation), two Polish footballers
 Vincent Žuk-Hryškievič (1903–1989), Belarusian politician
 Marlene Zuk (born 1956), American biologist and ecologist
 Wayne Zuk (born 1949), Canadian ice hockey player

Fictional characters:
 Georges Zuk, created by British writer Robin Skelton

See also
 
 Zhuk (surname) (also spelled Żuk and Žuk)

Polish-language surnames
Belarusian-language surnames